Y Ffôr is a Welsh village located on the Llŷn Peninsula in the county of Gwynedd.

History
Settlement at Y Ffôr dates back to the Stone Age, but the village itself was established at the beginning of the 19th century. It was originally known as 'Fourcrosses', as it was founded at a crossroads created with the construction of the Porthdinllaen Turnpike trust road (now the B4354), which crossed the road from Pwllheli to Caernarfon (now the A499). The Fourcrosses Inn meant that the village was a stopping point for stage coaches. Fairs were also held in the village square.

Education
The village has a primary school called Ysgol Bro Plennydd. This was built in 1912, to replace the former school near the Plasgwyn farm. It is named after Henry Jones Williams, a poet from the village who was known as Plennydd.

Community
Y Ffôr has historically been the home of many poets, and there used to be a literary society in the village run by the poet Plennydd.

References

Villages in Gwynedd
Llannor